A field galaxy is a galaxy that does not belong to a larger galaxy group or cluster and hence is gravitationally alone.

Roughly 80% of all galaxies located within  of the Milky Way are in groups or clusters of galaxies. Most low-surface-brightness galaxies are field galaxies. The median Hubble-type of field galaxies is Sb, a type of spiral galaxy.

List of field galaxies
A list of nearby relatively bright field galaxies within the Local Volume, about

Further reading

References 

Large-scale structure of the cosmos